Hyderabad City Police is the local law enforcement agency for the city of Hyderabad, Telangana and is headed by the Commissioner of Police. The city police traces its origins to 1847 under Hyderabad State.

History

1847–1948
The Nizam of Hyderabad used to appoint the commissioners of police who were officers of the Hyderabad Civil Service and they used to function during his pleasure. They were answerable to the Nizam directly on various matters of policing in Hyderabad city. However, as far as administrative matters were concerned the commissioner of police used to correspond with the Home Department directly. The commissioner of police was popularly called "Kotwal" and was responsible for the maintenance of the law and order, prevention and detection of crime, etc.

Reorganization
Due to rapid increase in population, there has been a steady increase in crime. In view of the above in 1981 the city police was re-organised, vide G.O.Ms.No.341, Home Department, dated: 1981-05-30. The following structure was instituted:
 The disciplinary and administrative control of the force is held by the Commissioner of Police, having powers and functions of additional district magistrate.
 The city was divided into five zones: south, east, west, central and north, the four zones were again divided into 12 divisions. Each zone is in the charge of a deputy commissioner of police of the rank of a superintendent of police for maintenance of law and order, criminal investigation and keeping up the morale of the force.
 Each division is under the care of an assistant commissioner of police of the rank of deputy superintendent of police, who works under the control of deputy commissioner of police. He is responsible for prevention and detection of crimes, maintenance of law and order and discipline of the force.
 Each police station is under the care of an inspector of police who is the station house officer and performs all the duties and exercises all the powers of that office.
 The city crimes station was renamed as "Detective Department" which works under the deputy commissioner of police, assisted by assistant commissioners of police and inspectors.
 In 1992, the Government of Andhra Pradesh sanctioned three joint commissioners of police posts in the rank of deputy inspector general to assist the commissioner of police for effective functioning and better administration of city police each in-charge of co-ordination, crimes and security.
 One sub-inspector of police was to be placed in charge of law and order duties and another for crime duties for each police station. A divisional detective inspector for each division was provided for. In order to achieve this functional division it was proposed in the scheme to increases the number of posts of sub-inspectors and head constables and decrease the number of posts of police constables.plus in the corona time the police doing very good and in 2020 rainy season they were protecting still in heavy rain go police
 In 2014, Andhra Pradesh was split into two. Hyderabad became a part of Telangana.

Current structure of Law and order Police Stations
Currently the Hyderabad City Police has five zones.

Central Zone
1)Abids Division : PS Abids, PS Narayanguda, PS Begumbazar
2)Chikkadpally Division : PS Gandhinagar, PS Musheerabad, PS Chikkadpally
3)Saifabad Division : PS Nampally, PS Ramgopalpet, PS Saifabad

West Zone 
1)Banjara hills Division: PS Banjara hills, PS Jubilee hills 
2)Panjagutta Division:PS Panjagutta, PS SR Nagar
3)Asifnagar Division: PS Lunger House,PS Golconda, PS Tappachabutra, PS Asifnagar, PS Humayunnagar

North Zone 
1)Mahankali Division: PS Mahankali, PS Market, PS Marredupally, PS Karkhana
2)Gopalpuram  Division: PS Gopalapuram, PS Tukaramgate, PS Lalaguda, PS Chilakalguda
3)Begumpet  Division: PS Begumpet, PS Bowenpally, PS Bollaram, PS Trimulgherry

South Zone 
1)Charminar Division: PS Charminar, PS Bahadurpura, PS Kamatipura, PS Hussaini Alam, PS Kalapattar
2)Mirchowk  Division: PS Mirchowk, PS Dabeerpura, PS Moghalpura, PS Rein Bazar
3)Falaknuma  Division: PS Falaknuma, PS Chandrayangutta,PS Shalibanda, PS Chatrinaka
4)Santosh nagar Division: PS Kanchanbagah, PS Bhavani Nagar, PS Madannapet, PS Santoshnagar

East Zone
1)Sultanbazaar Division: PS Sultanbazaar, PS Charderghat, PS Afzalgunj
2)Kachiguda Division: PS Kachiguda, PS Nallakunta, PS OU Sity
3)Malakpet Division: PS Malakpet, PS Saidabad, PS Amberpet

Women Police Stations
 WPS CCS
 WPS Begumpet
 WPS South zone

Traffic Police Stations
 Abid Traffic Police Station	
 Asif Nagar Traffic Police Station	
 Bahadurpura Traffic Police Station	
 Banjara Hills Traffic Police Station	
 Begumpet Traffic Police Station	
 Charminar Traffic Police Station	
 hikkadpally Traffic Police Station	
 Falaknuma Traffic Police Station	
 Gopalpuram Traffic Police StatioN	
 Goshamahal Traffic Police Station	
 Jubilee Hills Traffic Police Station	
 Kachiguda Traffic Police Station	
 Malakpet Traffic Police Station	
 Marredpally Traffic Police Station 	
 Mahankali Traffic Police Station	
 Mirchowk Traffic Police Station
 Nallakunta Traffic Police Station	
 Nampally Traffic Police Station	
 Narayanguda Traffic Police Station	
 Panjagutta Traffic Police Station	
 Saifabad Traffic Police Station
 SR. Nagar Traffic Police Station	
 Sultan Bazar Traffic Police Station	
 Trimulgherry Traffic Police Station
 Tolichowki Traffic Police Station

Insignia of Hyderabad Police (City Police)
Gazetted Officers

Non-gazetted officers

Online presence
Hyderabad Police launched Facebook pages for the police stations in Hyderabad on 16 December 2014. The pages can be used by the general public to report grievances.

Special agencies
 Intelligence Unit
 Commando Force
 Security Battalion

See also
Telangana Police
Nizamabad Police
Cyberabad Police
Rachakonda police

Notes

References

Telangana Police
Metropolitan law enforcement agencies of India
Government of Hyderabad, India
1847 establishments in India
Government agencies established in 1847